Olaf Krohn (4 June 1863 – 18 June 1933) was a Norwegian satirical illustrator, educated as painter. 

He is particularly known for his illustrations in the satirical magazine Vikingen.  He published the series Theaterkatten from 1897 to 1929. Among his other publications are Joujou; aarsrevue med vers from 1886, and Oslo-short-stories from 1929. He is represented in the National Gallery.

References 

1863 births
1933 deaths
Norwegian illustrators
Artists from Oslo